Horace Heidt (May 21, 1901 – December 1, 1986) was an American pianist, big band leader, and radio and television personality. His band, Horace Heidt and his Musical Knights, toured vaudeville and performed on radio and television during the 1930s and 1940s.

Early years
Born in Alameda, California, Heidt attended Culver Academies. At the University of California, Berkeley, he was a guard on the football team. A broken back suffered in a practice session caused him to give up football, leading him to turn his attention to music. He and some classmates formed a band, The Californians.

Career
From 1932 to 1953, he was one of the more popular radio bandleaders, heard on both NBC and CBS in a variety of different formats over the years. He began on the NBC Blue Network in 1932 with Shell Oil's Ship of Joy and Answers by the Dancers. During the late 1930s on CBS he did Captain Dobbsie's Ship of Joy and Horace Heidt's Alemite Brigadiers before returning to NBC for 1937–39 broadcasts. It was at this time that the band featured guitarist Alvino Rey and The King Sisters.

In 1936, Horace Heidt conducted an ensemble of eight musicians all of whom played harmonica on Saturday evenings at the Drake Hotel in Chicago.

Singer Matt Dennis got his start with Heidt's band, and Art Carney was the band's singing comedian. The Heidt band's recordings were highly successful, with "Gone with the Wind" going to No. 1 in 1937 and "Ti-Pi-Tin" to No. 1 in 1938. In 1939, "The Man with the Mandolin" ranked No. 2 on the chart.

He and his band played on the NBC Pot o' Gold radio show (1939–41).  The 1941 film of the same title, produced by James Roosevelt (son of the U.S. president) and directed by George Marshall, starred James Stewart and Paulette Goddard, and it featured Heidt portraying himself with his band. Carney can be glimpsed in some of the film's musical numbers. The movie gives a fairly accurate depiction of Heidt's radio show but features staged sequences, such as a scene in which a Minnesota farmer (allegedly phoned at random by Heidt during his radio show) is played by well-known character actor John Qualen.

From 1940 to 1944 he did Tums Treasure Chest, followed by 1943–45 shows on the Blue Network. Lucky Strike sponsored The American Way on CBS in 1953.

On December 7, 1947, Heidt shortly came out of his retirement and founded a talent show. The talent show was sponsored by Phillip Morris Cigarettes, and lasted several years. The show was called "The Original Youth Opportunity Program", the first televised, traveling talent show in America. The first winner of this show was famous accordion player Dick Contino. Other discoveries of note include, Dean Jones (actor), Johnny Carson, Marlene Willis, Florence Henderson, Al Hirt, Dominic Frontiere, Richard Keith (actor), Johnny Standley, Ralph Sigwald, Conley Graves, Dick Kerr, and Doodles Weaver.

Heidt died in 1986, aged 85, and was interred at Forest Lawn Memorial Park in Hollywood Hills, Los Angeles.

Legacy
For his contribution to radio, Heidt has a star on the Hollywood Walk of Fame at 1631 Vine Street; and a second star for his contribution to television at 6628 Hollywood Boulevard. In 2001, a Golden Palm Star on the Palm Springs Walk of Stars was dedicated to him.

Heidt developed an early apartment complex in the San Fernando Valley community of Sherman Oaks, in Los Angeles, so that his band members would have a place to live when they were in town for gigs, and many of the band members eventually retired there together. Known as Horace Heidt's Magnolia Estates, the complex is a  community of apartments, swimming pools, a clubhouse, and a golf course.

Discography

Billboard hits 
The songs are listed with the most widely successful first.

Friendly Tavern Polka" was re-released on 3-25-44. It was US Billboard 24-1944 (1 week). "Pound Your Table Polka" sung by Mary Martin was US Billboard 22-1942 (1 week). "It's in the Book" sung by Johnny Standley was US Billboard 1-1952 (2 weeks) million seller.

References

External links
 
 Horace Heidt History

1901 births
1986 deaths
People from Alameda, California
American bandleaders
Burials at Forest Lawn Memorial Park (Hollywood Hills)
Vaudeville performers
Brunswick Records artists
Big band bandleaders
20th-century American pianists
People from Brentwood, Los Angeles
American male pianists
20th-century American male musicians
Culver Academies alumni